is a Japanese manga artist, known for being the author of many shōnen and shōnen-ai series, including Dragon Knights and Lumen Lunae. Her Pen name derives from the fact that she likes wolves and cats (ohkami = wolf; neko = cat)

Works 
  (1990)
  (1990, Shinshokan Publishing); English translation: Dragon Knights (2002, Tokyopop)
  (1993)
 Asuka² (1994)
  (1995)
 Kurseong South: The Forest of Black Tea (2006)
 Dragon Kishidan Gaiden: One Day, Another Day (2007)
 Strawberry Palace (2008)
  (2009)
  (2014)

References

External links 
 

Living people
Manga artists from Nagasaki Prefecture
Year of birth missing (living people)